Gulya is a rural locality (a settlement) in the inter-settlement area of Tungiro-Olyokminsky District, Zabaykalsky Krai, Russia. The population was 26 as of 2021, mainly Evenks and Russians. The area is under the risk of forest fires.

Geography 
It is located in the Olyokma-Stanovik, on the confluence of the Gulya River and the Tungir on the right bank.

References 

Rural localities in Tungiro-Olyokminsky District